The International Red Cross and Red Crescent Museum is a museum located in Geneva, Switzerland.

Background

The International Red Cross and Red Crescent Museum asks a central question: how does humanitarian action affect us all, here and now? In order to reflect on this question with our visitors, we invite artists and cultural partners to examine the issues, values and the current situation of humanitarian action. It thus asserts itself, in an open, agile and warm manner, as a place of memory, creation and debate. Through the production of original artistic content and the development of ambitious partnerships in Switzerland and throughout the world, the museum contributes to the outreach of the International Red Cross and Red Crescent Movement and of Geneva.

The mission of the International Red Cross and Red Crescent Museum is to promote understanding of the history, current events and challenges of humanitarian aid by a wide audience in Switzerland and throughout the world, by encouraging contemporary artistic creation and developing innovative content with public and private partners from very different backgrounds and cultures. It thus constitutes and enhances a unique heritage, while stimulating a broad social, cultural and economic ecosystem in which it plays a central role.

An exhibition named “The Humanitarian Adventure” presents three contemporary problems through three distinct spaces; each created by a different architect: Defending human dignity (Gringo Cardia, Brazil), Reconstructing family links (Diébédo Francis Kéré, Burkina Faso), Reducing natural risks (Shigeru Ban, Japan).

Although it gives pride of place to knowledge and reflection, the museography introduces a new dimension into its device: emotion. As they enter each of the three thematic areas, visitors are invited to engage in an awareness-building experience even before they discover the area's informational content.

Twelve witnesses trace the main thread of “The Humanitarian Adventure”. They first welcome visitors in a scenographic device and then accompany them on their tour of the exhibition. The witnesses are there to remind us that human relations are at the heart of all humanitarian action.

In addition to its permanent exhibition, the Museum presents three temporary exhibitions each year.
The aim of the Museum is to create a space where a wide range of voices are brought into the discussion and debate on what is happening within the International Red Cross and Red Crescent Movement, the cultural scene and day-to-day life. Since 2021, it has also been focusing on an annual theme. In 2021, it inaugurated its first thematic year entitled "Gender & Diversity".

Gallery

References

External links

 Official website

International Red Cross and Red Crescent Movement
Museums in Geneva